The freckle-breasted thornbird (Phacellodomus striaticollis) is a species of bird in the family Furnariidae. It is found in Argentina, Bolivia, Brazil, and Uruguay. Its natural habitats are subtropical or tropical moist lowland forest, subtropical or tropical dry shrubland, and subtropical or tropical moist shrubland. It was first described by Alcide d'Orbigny and Frédéric de Lafresnaye in 1838, from Uruguay.

Description
The upper parts are brown, apart from the forehead, crown, wings and tail which are chestnut, the wing feathers being tipped with black. The lores and the underparts are whitish, the throat being buff, freckled with whiter spots, and the borders of the breast and the flanks being flushed with reddish-brown. The irises are pale yellow and the beak and the legs are horn-coloured. The song consists of a series of eight or ten notes, the first few being soft, moderately high-pitched and nasal, and the remainder being higher-pitched, clear and loud. It can be confused with the greater thornbird (Phacellodomus ruber), but that species is larger and more rufous.

Distribution and habitat
It never seems to venture far from water and occurs in the undergrowth of wood edges and riverine corridors, in thickets and in scrubby marshland.

Ecology
The freckle-breasted thornbird is similar to the greater thornbird in habits. Usually seen in pairs, it forages in the undergrowth and in more open marshy habitats for insects including beetles and scale insects. The nest is a bulky, gourd-shaped structure with a long, curved entrance tunnel, built on a branch or in a tree fork.  Eggs are laid between August and January, and it is possible that there are two broods.

Status
Phacellodomus striaticollis is a fairly common species with a wide range. No particular threats have been recognised and the population is thought to be stable, so the International Union for Conservation of Nature has rated the bird's conservation status as being of "least concern".

References

External links

freckle-breasted thornbird
Birds of Argentina
Birds of the Pampas
Birds of the South Region
Birds of Uruguay
freckle-breasted thornbird
Taxonomy articles created by Polbot